De'Keither Stamps (born November 21, 1976) is an American politician serving as a member of the Mississippi House of Representatives from the 66th district. He assumed office on October 16, 2020.

Early life and education 
Stamps was born on November 21, 1976, in Learned, Mississippi, and was raised in nearby Jackson, Mississippi. He graduated from Crystal Springs High School in 1995. He also attended Marine Corps University.

Career 
Stamps then joined the United States Marine Corps, after which he was assigned to President Bill Clinton's security team. Stamps was later a military security officer assigned to American embassies in Dar es Salaam, Nairobi, Geneva, and London. After leaving the Marine Corps in 2002, he joined the United States Army to fight in the Iraq War. After retiring again, he returned to Mississippi. Stamps served on the Jackson City Council from 2013 to 2020. Stamps was elected to the Mississippi House of Representatives in an October 16, 2020 special election.

References

External links

Living people
People from Jackson, Mississippi
Democratic Party members of the Mississippi House of Representatives
United States Marine Corps officers
United States Army officers
21st-century American politicians
African-American state legislators in Mississippi
21st-century African-American politicians
1976 births